An list of notable painters from Finland:

A
 Ilmari Aalto (1891–1934)
 Fredrik Ahlstedt (1839–1901) 
 Immanuel Alm (1767–1809), painter primarily of altarpieces
 Johan Alm (1728–1810), painter of primarily religious-themed works
 Tor Arne (born 1934)
 Helena Arnell (1697–1751) one of the first Finnish painters, and one of the few female artists

B
 Johan Backman (1706–1768)
 Adolf von Becker (1831–1909)
 Carl Bengts (1876–1934)
 Jonas Bergman (1724–1810)
 Gunnar Berndtson (1854–1895)
 Elias Brenner (1647–1717)

C
 Margareta Capsia (1682–1759), first professional native female painter in Finland
 Birger Carlstedt (1907–1975)
 Alvar Cawén (1886–1935)
 Fanny Churberg (1845–1892)
 Marcus Collin (1882–1966)

D
 Elin Danielson-Gambogi (1861–1919)

E
 Albert Edelfelt (1854–1905)
 Robert Wilhelm Ekman (1808–1873), teacher and painter of the Finnish romantic portraits
 Samuel Elmgren (1771–1834)
 Magnus Enckell (1870–1925)
 Cris af Enehielm (born 1954)

F
 Mauri Favén (1920–2006)
 Gustaf Wilhelm Finnberg (1784–1833)
 Hanna Frosterus-Segerstråle (1867–1946)
 Alexandra Frosterus-Såltin (1837–1916)

G
 Lars Gallenius (1658–1753)
 Akseli Gallen-Kallela (1865–1931)
 Jorma Gallen-Kallela (1898–1939)
 Johan Georg Geitel (1683–1771)
 Berndt Godenhjelm (1799–1881)
 Emanuel Granberg (1754–1797)
 Alvar Gullichsen (born 1961)

H
 Pekka Halonen (1865–1933)
 Ilona Harima (1911–1986)
 Johan Erik Hedberg (1767–1823)
 Gustaf Erik Hedman (1777–1841)
 Jonas Heiska (1873–1937)
 Werner Holmberg (1830–1860)

I
 Edvard Isto (1865–1905)

J
 Fritz Jakobsson (born 1940), portraitist
 Karl Emanuel Jansson (1846–1874)
 Tove Jansson (1914–2001), Swedish-Finnish novelist, painter, and comic strip author
 Eero Järnefelt (1863–1937)

K
 Rudolf Koivu (1890–1946), painter best known for illustrating books of fairytales for children
 Väinö Kunnas (1896–1929)
 Sinikka Kurkinen (born 1935)

L
 Vilho Lampi (1898–1936)
 Claes Lang (1690–1761)
 Aleksander Lauréus (1783–1823)
 Kuutti Lavonen (born 1960)
 Nikolai Lehto (1905–1994)
 Armas Lindgren (1874–1929), architect, professor and painter
 Johan Erik Lindh (1793–1865)
 Berndt Lindholm (1841–1914)
 Erik Johan Löfgren (1825–1884)
 Sirkka-Liisa Lonka (born 1943)
 Gustaf Lucander (1724–1805)
 Amélie Lundahl (1850–1914)
 Leena Luostarinen (1949–2013)

M
 Charlotta Malm-Reuterholm (1768–1845), Finnish-Swedish artist, painter, writer and noble
 Totte Mannes (born 1933)
 Jaakko Mattila (born 1976)
 Bruno Maximus (born 1970)
 Nándor Mikola (1911–2006), watercolor painter
 Timo K. Mukka (1944–1973)
 Hjalmar Munsterhjelm (1840–1905)
 Helvi Mustonen (born 1947)
 Abraham Myra (1639–1684)
 Lars Myra (died 1712)
 Didrik Möllerum (1642–1702)

N
 Jochim Neiman (1600–1673)
 Eero Nelimarkka (1891–1977)
 Johannes Nevala (born 1966)

O
 Yrjö Ollila (1887–1932)
 Paul Osipow (born 1939)

P
 Kalervo Palsa (1947–1987)

R
 Mathilda Rotkirch (1813–1842)
 Jalmari Ruokokoski (1886–1936)

S
 Yrjö Saarinen (1899–1958)
 Tyko Sallinen (1879–1955)
 Santeri Salokivi (1886–1940)
 Reidar Särestöniemi (1925–1981), painter from Lapland
 Sigrid Schauman (1877–1979)
 Nils Schillmark (1745–1804)
 Helene Schjerfbeck (1862–1946)
 Hugo Simberg (1873–1917)
 Anita Snellman (1924–2006)
 Eero Snellman (1890–1951)
 Venny Soldan-Brofeldt (1863–1945)
 Kaj Stenvall (born 1951)
 Johan Stålbom (1712–1777)
 Léopold Survage (1879–1968), painter of Russian-Danish-Finnish descent 
 Gabriel Gotthard Sweidel (1744–1813)

T
 Marjatta Tapiola (born 1951)
 Emanuel Thelning (1767–1831)
 Ellen Thesleff (1869–1954)
 Verner Thomé (1878–1953)
 Mikael Toppelius (1734–1821)
 Veikko Törmänen (born 1945)

V
 Sam Vanni (1908–1992)

W
 Isak Wacklin (1720–1758)
 Dora Wahlroos (1870–1947)
 Martta Wendelin (1893–1986)
 Victor Westerholm (1860–1919)
 Erik Westzynthius the Elder (1711–1757)
 Erik Westzynthius the Younger (1743–1787)
 Sigurd Wettenhovi-Aspa (1870–1946), artist and amateur egyptologist
 Maria Wiik (1853–1928)
 Ferdinand von Wright (1822–1906)
 Magnus von Wright (1805–1868), painter and ornithologist
 Wilhelm von Wright (1810–1887)
 Henry Wuorila-Stenberg (born 1949)

External links
 Articles on the painters at Finnish Wikipedia

Finnish